Presidential primaries and caucuses are being organized by the Democratic Party to select the delegates to the 2024 Democratic National Convention, to determine the party's nominee for president in the 2024 United States presidential election. The elections will take place in all 50 U.S. states, the District of Columbia, five U.S. territories, and Democrats Abroad, and will be held between February and June that year.

While incumbent president Joe Biden has consistently stated that he plans to run for re-election and keep vice president Kamala Harris as his running mate, he has yet to officially declare his candidacy. Throughout 2022, as Biden was suffering from low approval ratings, there was speculation that he would not seek re-election, and some prominent Democrats have publicly urged Biden not to run. In addition to Biden's unpopularity, many are concerned about his age; he was the oldest person to assume the office at age 78 and would be 82 at the end of his first term. If re-elected, he would be 86 at the end of his second term. There has also been speculation that Biden may face a primary challenge from a member of the Democratic Party's progressive faction, an opinion that has proven to be vindicated with author, progressive activist and 2020 Biden rival Marianne Williamson declaring a primary challenge in March 2023 before Biden could announce his own intentions. However, Biden's approval rating slowly recovered by the end of 2022. Additionally, after Democrats outperformed expectations in the 2022 midterm elections, many believed the chances that Biden would run for and win his party's nomination had increased.

Candidates

Declared major candidates 
The candidates in this section have declared their candidacies and received substantial media coverage, hold or have held significant elected office, and/or have been included in at least five national polls.

Other declared candidates
The candidates in this section are otherwise noteworthy, but have not met the requirements to be considered major candidates.
 Jerome Segal, research scholar and Bread and Roses Party nominee for president in 2020

Decision pending
, the following notable individuals are expected to make an announcement regarding their official candidacy within a set timeline.
 Joe Biden, 46th President of the United States (2021–present), 47th Vice President of the United States (2009–2017), United States Senator from Delaware (1973–2009), member of the New Castle County Council for the 4th district (1971–1973), candidate for president in 1988 and 2008 (decision expected in April 2023)

Publicly expressed interest
, the following notable individuals have expressed an interest in running for president within the previous six months.
 Robert F. Kennedy Jr., environmental lawyer, author and anti-vaccine activist

Potential candidates
, the following notable individuals have been subjects of speculation about their potential candidacy within the previous six months. Most of these candidates are viewed as potential replacements if President Biden does not seek re-election, while some are viewed as potential primary challenges if he does.

Cori Bush, United States Representative from MO-01 (2021–present)

 Mark Kelly, United States Senator from Arizona (2020–present)

 Mitch Landrieu, Senior Advisor to the President for Infrastructure Coordination (2021–present), 61st Mayor of New Orleans (2010–2018), 51st Lieutenant Governor of Louisiana (2004–2010), member of the Louisiana House of Representatives from the 90th district (1988–2004) 
 Joe Manchin, United States Senator from West Virginia (2010–present), 34th Governor of West Virginia (2005–2010), 27th West Virginia Secretary of State (2001–2005), member of the West Virginia Senate from the 13th district (1986–1996), member of the West Virginia House of Delegates from the 31st district (1982–1986) 

 Alexandria Ocasio-Cortez, United States Representative from NY-14 (2019–present)

 Jon Ossoff, United States Senator from Georgia (2021–present)

 Ayanna Pressley, United States Representative from MA-07 (2019–present), member of the Boston City Council at-large (2010–2019)
 Gina Raimondo, 40th United States Secretary of Commerce (2021–present), 75th Governor of Rhode Island (2015–2021), 30th General Treasurer of Rhode Island (2011–2015)
 Jamie Raskin, United States Representative from MD-08 (2017–present), member of the Maryland Senate from the 10th district (2007–2016)

 Josh Shapiro, 48th Governor of Pennsylvania (2023–present), 50th Attorney General of Pennsylvania (2017–2023), member of the Montgomery County Board of Commissioners (2012–2017), member of the Pennsylvania House of Representatives from the 153rd district (2005–2012)

 Nina Turner, member of the Ohio Senate from the 25th district (2008–2014), member of the Cleveland City Council (2006–2008)

Declined to be candidates
The following notable individuals have been the subject of speculation about their possible candidacy, but have publicly denied interest in running.
 Stacey Abrams, founder of Fair Fight Action, Minority Leader of the Georgia House of Representatives (2011–2017) from the 89th district (2007–2017), nominee for Governor of Georgia in 2018 and 2022
 Eric Adams, 110th Mayor of New York City (2022–present)
 Andy Beshear, 63rd Governor of Kentucky (2019–present), 50th Attorney General of Kentucky (2016–2019) (running for re-election)
 Cory Booker, United States Senator from New Jersey (2013–present), 38th Mayor of Newark, New Jersey (2006–2013), member of the Municipal Council of Newark (1998–2002), candidate for president in 2020
 Sherrod Brown, United States Senator from Ohio (2007–present), United States Representative from OH-13 (1993–2007), 47th Secretary of State of Ohio (1983–1991) (running for re-election)
 Pete Buttigieg, 19th United States Secretary of Transportation (2021–present), 32nd Mayor of South Bend, Indiana (2012–2020), candidate for president in 2020 (endorsed Biden)
 Hillary Clinton, 67th United States Secretary of State (2009–2013), United States Senator from New York (2001–2009), First Lady of the United States (1993–2001), First Lady of Arkansas (1979–1981, 1983–1992), Democratic presidential nominee in 2016, candidate for president in 2008
 Roy Cooper, 75th Governor of North Carolina (2017–present), 49th Attorney General of North Carolina (2001–2017), Majority Leader of the North Carolina Senate (1997–2001) from the 10th district (1991–2001), member of the North Carolina House of Representatives from the 72nd district (1987–1991) 
 Al Gore, 45th Vice President of the United States (1993–2001), United States Senator from Tennessee (1985–1993), United States Representative from TN-06 (1977–1985), Democratic presidential nominee in 2000, candidate for president in 1988
 Jay Inslee, 23rd Governor of Washington (2013–present), United States Representative from WA-01 (1993–1995, 1999–2012), candidate for president in 2020
 Ro Khanna, United States Representative from CA-17 (2017–present)
 Amy Klobuchar, United States Senator from Minnesota (2007–present), County Attorney of Hennepin County (1999–2007), candidate for president in 2020 (running for re-election) Wes Moore, 63rd Governor of Maryland (2023–present)
 Chris Murphy, United States Senator from Connecticut (2013–present), United States Representative from CT-05 (2007–2013), member of the Connecticut State Senate from the 16th district (2003–2007), member of the Connecticut House of Representatives from the 81st district (1999–2003) (running for re-election) Phil Murphy, 56th Governor of New Jersey (2018–present), United States Ambassador to Germany (2009–2013), Finance Chair of the Democratic National Committee (2006–2009)
 Gavin Newsom, 40th Governor of California (2019–present), 49th Lieutenant Governor of California (2011–2019), 41st Mayor of San Francisco (2004–2011)
 Michelle Obama, First Lady of the United States (2009–2017)
 Jared Polis, 43rd Governor of Colorado (2019–present), United States Representative from CO-02 (2009–2019), member of the Colorado State Board of Education (2001–2007)
 J. B. Pritzker, 43rd Governor of Illinois (2019–present)
 Adam Schiff, United States Representative from CA-30 (2001–present) (running for U.S. Senate) Jon Stewart, host of The Problem with Jon Stewart (2021–present), host of The Daily Show (1998–2015)
 Elizabeth Warren, United States Senator from Massachusetts (2013–present), candidate for president in 2020
 Gretchen Whitmer, 49th Governor of Michigan (2019–present), Ingham County Prosecuting Attorney (2016), Minority Leader of the Michigan Senate (2011–2015) from the 23rd district (2006–2015), member of the Michigan House of Representatives from the 69th district (2001–2006)

 Vice presidential speculation 
On January 19, 2022, Biden confirmed that Harris would be his running mate in 2024 in his likely re-election campaign.

Some Democrats have been skeptical about Biden choosing Harris again as his running mate, as she has also seen similar low approval ratings to Biden. U.S. Senator Elizabeth Warren said in a radio interview that she supported Biden's reelection, but stopped short of supporting Harris. She later reverted her decision, saying she supported the Biden-Harris ticket.

Timeline

Biden declared his intent in January 2022 to run for re-election, keeping vice president Kamala Harris as his running mate. On September 15, he told Scott Pelley in a CBS 60 Minutes interview that he has not yet committed to run. In a private conversation with civil-rights activist Al Sharpton on October 3, he reportedly told Sharpton that he is seeking re-election. On October 11, he told Jake Tapper in an interview on CNN that he would decide whether or not to seek re-election after the 2022 midterm elections. 

Throughout 2022, several prominent Democrats publicly urged Biden not to run for a second term. On June 23, shortly after winning the Democratic nomination in the South Carolina gubernatorial race, former U.S. Representative Joe Cunningham told CNN that he believed Biden would be too old by the end of his second term and should not run in 2024. CNN pointed out that Biden had endorsed Cunningham in his 2018 and 2020 campaigns. In July, U.S. Representative Dean Phillips of Minnesota said he believed that Democrats should nominate someone from a younger generation in 2024, and fellow Minnesota Representative Angie Craig agreed with him the following week. On August 1, then-U.S. Representative Carolyn Maloney told The New York Times that she thought Biden should not run in 2024 and that she believed he would not run. She later apologized and said that he should run again, though she reiterated her belief that he would not. In September, U.S. Representative and Ohio U.S. Senate nominee Tim Ryan similarly called for a "generational move" away from Biden during an interview with a local TV station; Forbes Magazine'' noted that Biden, who had endorsed Ryan, headlined a rally with him just hours after the interview aired.

On February 4, 2023, the Democratic National Committee approved a new 2024 primary calendar, moving South Carolina to hold its race first on February 3, followed by Nevada and New Hampshire on February 6, Georgia on February 13, and Michigan on February 27. Iowa, which traditionally goes first, would then be held later in the primary season. This vote was preceded by a December 2022 vote of the DNC Rules and Bylaws Committee, held after a letter from President Biden requesting the change was released.  DNC members who supported this new plan say this will give a better representation of Democratic voters' preference during the early months of the campaign. Members of the Iowa Democratic Party and the New Hampshire Democratic Party opposed the move since they would no longer be the first two states to hold their races, respectively. Democratic officials from New Hampshire and Georgia also note that moving their primaries to comply with the new calendar would require changing their respective state laws (New Hampshire state law mandates them to hold the first primary in the country, while Georgia state law requires them to hold both the Democratic and Republican primaries on the same day), which is unlikely to happen since both states have governors and state legislatures controlled by Republicans. New Hampshire governor Chris Sununu in particular criticized the DNC's plan as an "absolute joke ... It's just based on a personal preference of a candidate". The DNC has given Georgia and New Hampshire until June to change their primary dates, but it is unclear how they will proceed if these Republican-controlled legislatures fail to change their state laws to comply.

Endorsements

Polling 

 Aggregate polls

Nationwide polling

Nationwide polling

See also
2024 United States presidential election
2024 Democratic National Convention
2024 Republican Party presidential primaries

Notes

References

External links 

 Democratic National Committee 2024 Primary Schedule Vote on C-Span
 President Joe Biden and Vice President Kamala Harris speak at Democratic National Committee Winter Meeting on C-Span

 
2023 in American politics
2024 United States presidential primaries
Political timelines of the 2020s by year